The Protestant Church of West Kalimantan (Gereja Protestan Kalimantan Barat) is located in West Kalimantan, Indonesia. The church was founded in 1963 and grew slowly until outreach to the Dayak community in the 1990s. The church had 6,600 members and 20 congregations in 2004, and has women officers. The Protestant Church in Kalimantan Barat has Presbyterian church government.

References 

1963 establishments in Indonesia
Protestantism in Indonesia
Religious organizations based in Indonesia
Christian organizations established in 1963
West Kalimantan